Feria: The Darkest Light is a Spanish fantasy thriller television series created by Agustín Martínez and Carlos Montero, produced by Filmax. It is set in 1990s Andalusia, where two sisters must face a new reality—and supernatural elements—as it is revealed their parents participated in a cult ritual ending in 23 deaths. The series premiered on Netflix 28 January 2022.

Premise 
The plot of the fantasy thriller series is set in an Andalusian village in the mid 1990s and it follows two teenage sisters, Eva and Sofía, who find out that their parents, who have just disappeared, have committed a crime with a toll of 23 deaths. Sofia, wishing to see her mother again, follows the cult to open the doorway to the 'Kingdom' (aka hell). Eva is having trouble finding her sister and has constant hallucinations. Their parents tried to stop the doorway to the 'Kingdom' and the mother was trapped there for stopping it. Sofia opens it and realizes too late she unleashed the devil. But she hopes to be able to get her mother out of the 'Kingdom'.

Cast

Production and release 

Feria is created by Carlos Montero and Agustín Martínez. Produced by Filmax and directed by Jorge Dorado and Carles Torrens, it consists of 8 episodes with a running time of about 50 minutes. Netflix announced the start of the filming on 16 November 2020. After shooting in Minas de Riotinto (province of Huelva), production moved to Zahara de la Sierra (province of Cádiz), where shooting started on 26 February 2021. The presence of the production team reportedly gave some relief to the tourism-centered economy of the village, in the off-season because of the COVID-19 pandemic.

Episodes

References

External links 
 
 

2020s Spanish drama television series
Spanish fantasy television series
Spanish thriller television series
Television shows set in Andalusia
Television shows filmed in Spain
2022 Spanish television series debuts
Spanish-language Netflix original programming
Dark fantasy television series